Micragrotis cinerosa is a species of moth of the family Noctuidae first described by George Thomas Bethune-Baker in 1911. It is found in Africa, including South Africa.

References

External links 
 

Noctuinae
Moths of Africa
Moths described in 1911